Melissa Price (born 20 September 1977) is a retired pole vaulter from the United States.

She competed at the 1997 World Indoor Championships and the 1999 World Championships.

Her personal best jump was  metres, achieved in May 1998 in Houston.

In 1995, while at Kingsburg High School in Kingsburg, California, Price set the first NFHS national high school record in the pole vault at 12' 6".

Women were so new to pole vaulting that Price won the 1994 and 1995 National Championships while still in high school. Price, then competing for Fresno State University finished second to Dragila the next two years and finished third in 1999. But 2000, the first Olympic year for women's pole vault, the competition had increased. In Sydney, Dragila won the first gold medal.

References

External links

1977 births
Living people
American female pole vaulters
People from Kingsburg, California